Operation Libelle ("Dragonfly" in German) was an evacuation operation of the German Armed Forces that took place on March 14, 1997 in the Albanian capital of Tirana during the Albanian Civil War. In the same week, American, British, and Italian military forces evacuated their citizens from Albania. Operation Libelle was the first time since World War II that German infantry fired shots in combat.

Situation in Albania
In early 1997, riots spread across Albania after the collapse of major pyramid schemes drove the country into a serious economic and social crisis, culminating in the Albanian Civil War. After army and police armories were looted by insurgents, criminals, and civilians, large parts of the country descended into chaos and violence. On March 11 all foreign nationals were instructed to leave Albania; Italian and U.S. forces conducted initial evacuation operations. By midday of March 13 the widespread disorder made leaving the country by conventional means nearly impossible. With nowhere to go dozens of people fled to the German embassy, which had not yet evacuated.

Timeline
March 13
 On the eve of the operation, the German Minister of Defence, Volker Rühe, decided to reduce the reaction time of German Forces in case of emergency in Albania and ordered the frigate Niedersachsen to enter Albanian waters.
March 14
Five CH-53G heavy transport helicopters with 89 soldiers from the German SFOR contingent headed from Bosnia to Dubrovnik, Croatia. At the same time in Germany, three C-160 transport planes had been held in readiness to fly to the Balkans. The Niedersachsen waited in readiness in the port of Durrës, Albania.
 11.30 am - The German Government under Chancellor Helmut Kohl decided to deploy German Forces to evacuate the embassy. Because the German military cannot operate abroad without a permission of the German Parliament, the Government employed emergency rules and only informed the leaders of the parliament and the Defence Committee about the planned operation. The C-160s flew to Podgorica, Montenegro. The task force, consisting of CH-53s and soldiers from combat, supporting, and medical units, lifted off to Tirana.
 3.39 pm - Although American Forces had cancelled a separate evacuation operation in Tirana after a Blackhawk helicopter was hit by small arms fire, Colonel Glawatz decided to continue the approach. The first CH-53 landed on an abandoned airfield near the outskirts of Tirana. Perimeter security was established and the civilians started to board the helicopters. Insurgents in armoured vehicles approached the area and attacked the escaping civilians. As the German units returned fire, additional gunmen opened fire from the edge of the air strip. At least 188 rounds were fired at the evacuation force, and one CH-53 helicopter was hit and lightly damaged. At least one Albanian was wounded.
 4.09 pm - the last helicopter left Tirana.
 The helicopters returned to Montenegro with the refugees after the successful end of the operation; they were then transported to Germany.

List of evacuated persons

External links 

 Details about the helicopters used 

Albanian Civil War
Conflicts in 1997
Libelle
1997 in Albania
Modern history of Albania
March 1997 events in Europe
Combat incidents
Battles and conflicts without fatalities
Non-combatant evacuation operations